Cereals Event is the UK’s largest arable farming event which takes place each year. The event attracts around 350 exhibitors and around 20,000 visitors and features 60ha of working demonstrations of agricultural equipment, stands, business advice and specialist services covering the entire arable industry.

History 

Cereals was launched in 1979.

Event dates 

Cereals 2022 took place at Chrishall Grange Cambridgeshire and was hosted by Law Farming on 8-9 June 2022.  Cereals 2023 will take place at a new venue, Thoresby Estate Nottinghamshire UK on 13-14 June 2023.

References

External links
 Official website and 2022 video

Agricultural shows in England
1979 establishments in England
Festivals in Lincolnshire
Festivals established in 1979